Shah Niamatullah Butshikan was a wali of the pre-Mughal Empire period. He preached Islam in the Indian subcontinent. His grave is situated in Dilkusha, Dhaka.

Biography
The common understanding is that Niamatullah was originally a prince of Baghdad located in modern-day Iraq. Adopting a spartan and disciplined lifestyle he went to the Indian subcontinent to preach Islam. Settling in Bengal he established his khanqah in Dhaka. He is credited with converting a large number of people to Islam, becoming known as a wali or saint. His shrine is situated in Dilkusha, Dhaka. Khwaja Abdul Ghani financed in reconstruction of his shrine.

References

Bengali Sufi saints
People from Dhaka
People from Baghdad